Professor of Comparative Law may refer to:

 Professor of Comparative Law (Oxford) at the University of Oxford, formerly the Linklaters Professor of Comparative Law
 Quain Professor of Comparative Law at University College London, now known as the Quain Professor of Jurisprudence